Green for Danger is a 1946 British thriller film, based on the 1944 detective novel of the same name by Christianna Brand. It was directed by Sidney Gilliat and stars Alastair Sim, Trevor Howard, Sally Gray and Rosamund John. The film was shot at Pinewood Studios in England. The title is a reference to the colour-coding used on the gas canisters used by anaesthetists.

Plot
In August 1944, during the V-1 "doodlebug" offensive on London, patient Joseph Higgins (Moore Marriott) dies on the operating table in a rural British hospital in the southeast of England. The anaesthetist, Barney Barnes (Trevor Howard), has had a patient die previously in somewhat similar circumstances, and the hospital manager, Dr White (Ronald Adam), asks him to voluntarily suspend himself from duty, but Barnes angrily refuses.

Later,  Sister Bates (Judy Campbell) claims to have evidence that Higgins was murdered, but before she can show anyone, she is stabbed to death herself by someone in a surgical gown. Scotland Yard Inspector Cockrill (Alistair Sim) is assigned to investigate. Maintaining a cheerful attitude about the serious business at hand, he declares happily that there are just five obvious suspects: Barnes; the surgeon, Mr Eden (Leo Genn); and three nurses, Freddi Linley (Sally Gray), Esther Sanson (Rosamund John), and Woods (Megs Jenkins). His investigation is hampered by the conflict between Barnes and Eden because of their competition for the affections of Linley. Some pills are revealed to be missing.

After Linley also mentions having an idea about the murders, the others advise her to wait until she can talk to Cockrill about it. She goes to bed and someone puts a shilling in the coin-operated gas meter without lighting the gas fire in her room. Before she is killed by the carbon monoxide in the coal gas, Sanson smells the gas, calls out, and breaks the window; but while being removed from the room, Linley falls down stairs.  The inspector takes her away without allowing Barnes to examine her.

It turns out that Linley has a depressed skull fracture and craniotomy surgery is required. Cockrill demands that this be done by the remaining suspects themselves, re-enacting as far as possible the operation that killed Higgins. When Eden objects, Cockrill agrees to have him replaced, but insists he assist. The anaesthesia machine is discussed: it can dispense oxygen, nitrous oxide, and carbon dioxide from colour-coded bottles into the patient's mask. Woods puts in a new oxygen bottle, as was done with Higgins.

As Linley is anaesthetised, she quickly shows signs of distress; put on pure oxygen, she still does not respond, all just as happened to Higgins. But this time the reserve oxygen bottle is put into use, and she recovers. Cockrill then scratches paint off the "oxygen" bottle that was being used, revealing the green of a carbon dioxide bottle. As Linley awakens, he reveals that she had no head injury but was participating to help trap the murderer. Linley tells what she had noticed about the gown Bates was wearing when she was stabbed: a piece of it had been cut out, and the knife carefully placed through the hole to disguise it. And Cockrill now points to a mark on Woods's gown from still-wet paint on the "oxygen" bottle she put in.

The murderer is Sanson.  Some time ago her mother had died after being buried in an air raid, and Higgins had worked on freeing her; but Sanson thinks he took too long and she blames him for her death. She killed him over this, and Bates to protect herself; she staged the gas "attack" and rescue of Linley to put herself above suspicion, but then decided to kill her anyway.  While Sanson is confessing, Eden quietly loads a syringe.  Sansom then flees from the room and Eden runs after her, but Cockrill stops him from injecting her. Sanson then collapses and dies; she had poisoned herself with the missing pills, and Eden was trying to give her the antidote. 

As Cockrill leaves, he resumes the voiceover from the start of the film, which is his letter to his superior about the case. He remarks that it was "not one of my most successful cases" and offers his resignation—in the hope that it will not be accepted.

Cast
Sally Gray as Nurse Frederica "Freddi" Linley
Trevor Howard as Dr. Barney Barnes
Rosamund John as Nurse Esther Sanson
Alastair Sim as Inspector Cockrill
Leo Genn as Mr. Eden
Judy Campbell as Sister Marion Bates
Megs Jenkins as Nurse Woods
Moore Marriott as Joseph Higgins (the postman)
Henry Edwards as Mr. Purdy
Ronald Adam as Dr. White
George Woodbridge as Detective Sergeant Hendricks
 Wendy Thompson as Sister Carter 
 John Rae as the porter 
 Frank Ling as rescue worker

Production
It was based on a novel by Christianna Brand. She was married to a surgeon who was assigned to a military hospital. She went along to watch an operation and the anaesthetist told her how to commit a murder. She thought of turning this into a thriller but could not think of a motive until a drunk man told her of an experience in a bomb shelter. She wrote the book which was published in 1941. The New York Times called it "extremely involved."

Sidney Gilliat said he bought a copy of the novel at Victoria Station to read on a train. He said he was not attracted by the detective or the hospital setting but "what appealed to me was the anesthetics - the rhythmic ritual, from wheeling the patient out to putting him out and keeping him out (in this case, permanently), with all those crosscutting opportunities offered by flowmeters, hissing gas, cylinders, palpitating rubber bags, and all the other trappings, in the middle of the Blitz, too."

In December 1945 the film was announced as a project for Individual Pictures, the company of Gilliat and Frank Launder. In January 1946 it was announced Robert Morley would star. Morley was eventually replaced by Alistair Sim.

It was the first movie to be made at Pinewood Studios. Pinewood was to be the basis for three companies: Individual, Cineguild and the Archers.

Reception
The film was originally banned out of fear it would undermine confidence in hospitals. This was overruled and the film was passed with one minor cut.

Box Office
According to trade papers, the film was a "notable box office attraction" at British cinemas in 1947. Unfortunately, it lost £26,600 (equivalent to £ in ) by 24 December 1949.

Critical
The film has also been highly praised by critics. The Monthly Film Bulletin said: "Though the story has plenty of improbabilities when considered in cold blood, this thriller holds one well when on the screen. Alastair Sim is most amusing as the self-important detective who enjoys tormenting his suspects, but who comes a partial cropper despite his assurance." Leslie Halliwell noted that it was a "classic comedy-thriller, with serious detection balanced by excellent jokes and performances, also by moments of fright". François Truffaut later argued the film "didn't quite come off". The New York Times stated: "Sidney Gilliat and Frank Launder have laid deftly humorous hands on the subject of murder. And, while they manage to keep the spectator chuckling most of the time, they never for a moment lose sight of a mystery film's prime purpose—that is, to intrigue and startle the onlooker. What more could one ask? In the case of Green For Danger one could reasonably request just a bit more justification for the solution, which, truth to tell, is bewildering."

The Brooklyn Eagle was enthusiastic: "an expert concoction of thrills, homicide, and laughs. It's also a fine showcase for the talents of Alastair Sim, a new type of detective with a sense of humor. He easily dominates this melodrama about an old English estate that has been converted into a hospital. It's during World War II and there's dirty work afoot. Plenty of it, with two murders, one near-murder, and one dramatic death. Who says the English have no sense of humor? Green for Danger will convince them otherwise. And give them some chills at the same time."

For the Buffalo Courier-Express, the film was "an ambitious, highly acceptable murder melodrama...expertly acted and smartly directed....the musical score is a big asset."

Home video releases
The Criterion Collection released Green for Danger on laserdisc in 1993 with optional audio commentary by Bruce Eder.  Home Vision Cinema released it on VHS at the same time.  Criterion released the film on DVD in 2007 with Eder's commentary and a 2007 interview documentary produced by Heather Shaw, "Geoff Brown on Green for Danger" (Brown being the author of a book on the work of Gilliat and Launder). The DVD also includes a booklet with an essay on the film by Geoffrey O'Brien and a programme note by Gilliat from a 1960s revival screening.

References

External links

 
Green for Danger at TCMDB
Green for Danger at BFI Screenonline
Green for Danger at Reel Streets
Green for Danger at Letterbox DVD
Complete pressbook at Internet Archive
 
 
Green for Danger: Laughing While the Bombs Fall an essay by Geoffrey O'Brien at the Criterion Collection

1946 films
1940s mystery thriller films
British black-and-white films
British mystery thriller films
British detective films
Police detective films
Films based on British novels
Films set in hospitals
Films set in 1944
Films with screenplays by Frank Launder and Sidney Gilliat
Films directed by Sidney Gilliat
Films shot at Pinewood Studios
Films scored by William Alwyn
1940s English-language films
1940s British films